Southern Roots: Back Home in Memphis is an album by Jerry Lee Lewis released on Mercury Records in 1973.

Background
Southern Roots: Back Home in Memphis was touted as a "comeback" album for Lewis, which was misleading at best; Lewis had been enjoying enormous success on the country music charts since 1968, scoring 15 top 10 hits (including four chart toppers) and selling out concerts on the road. In addition, although the title implies a return to his rock and roll roots, Lewis had enjoyed his highest pop charting album since 1973 with The Session...Recorded in London with Great Artists, a collaboration with British rockers that had been released earlier in the year and had reached number 37. His singles "Me and Bobby McGee" had also grazed the top 40 (peaking at #40, 1972). As Stephen Thomas Erlewine of AllMusic observed, "Apart from the gospel closer, country has been consciously removed from the menu, a move that feels like the producer's choice, since Lewis' performances aren't all that much different or more impassioned than what came before...Jerry Lee doesn't sound relieved to be in this setting; he simply sounds like himself, barrelling through a set of songs as he twists them to suit his needs."

Recording and reception
Produced by Huey Meaux, a fellow Louisiana wild man who had just recently gotten out of prison, the sessions commenced in September 1973, which would go on to be a hellish year for Lewis; he was jailed and fined for driving while intoxicated and, just after his release, his son Jerry Lee Lewis, Jr. was killed when a car he was towing jackknifed and hit the abutment of a bridge near Hernando, Mississippi. Three weeks later, Lewis's fourth wife, Jaren, filed for divorce. According to Rick Bragg's authorized biographer Jerry Lee Lewis: His Own Story, Lewis was in a foul mood when he showed up at Trans Maximus Studios in Memphis to record: "During these sessions, he insulted the producer, threatened to kill a photographer, and drank and medicated his way into but not out of a fog."  During one exchange that can be heard on the 2013 reissue Southern Roots: The Original Sessions, Meaux asks Lewis, "Do you wanna try one?", meaning a take, to which Lewis replies "If you got enough fuckin' sense to cut it." Recorded over three days, the album displays a heavy soul influence, with Lewis receiving support from Stax Records alumni Steve Cropper, Al Jackson, Jr. and Donald "Duck" Dunn, fellow rock and roll icon Carl Perkins, Tony Joe White and the Memphis Horns, but a single, the overtly lascivious "Meat Man," did not crack either the pop or country charts. (In his essay for the box set Mercury Smashes...and Rockin' Sessions, Colin Escott calls "Meat Man" "so wonderfully lewd" that Lewis was the "only person in country music who would even have considered cutting it.")

Southern Roots did make the Billboard country albums chart, peaking at number 6. The album garnered Lewis a lot of publicity and good will, and he remained a huge in-demand performer, appearing on the ABC series In Concert and the now classic late-night TV series The Midnight Special. As recounted in Bragg's 2014 biography, when Lewis played the Roxy in Los Angeles a month.

Track listing
"Meat Man" (Mack Vickery)
"When a Man Loves a Woman" (Calvin Lewis, Andrew Wright)
"Hold On! I'm Comin'" (Isaac Hayes, David Porter)
"Just a Little Bit" (Rosco Gordon)
"Born to Be a Loser" (Karen Carpenter, Richard Carpenter)
"The Haunted House" (Bob Geddins)
"Blueberry Hill" (Al Lewis, Vincent Rose, Larry Stock)
"The Revolutionary Man" (Doug Sahm)
"Big Blue Diamonds" (Kit Carson)
"That Old Bourbon Street Church" (Mack Vickery)

Personnel
Jerry Lee Lewis - vocals, piano
Tony Joe White, Carl Perkins, James Tarbutton, Kenny Lovelace, Paul Cannon, Steve Cropper - guitar
Charles Owens - steel guitar
Donald Dunn, Herman "Hawk" Hawkins, Tommy Cathey - bass
J.L. "Marty" Morrison - organ
Augie Meyers - Vox organ
Al Jackson Jr., Joel Williams, Robert "Tarp" Tarrant - drums
Jerry Lee Lewis, Jr. - percussion
Mack Vickery - harmonica
Bill Taylor, Mark Lindsay (ex. Paul Revere & the Raiders, saxophone), Russ Carlton - horns
Memphis Horns: Andrew Love, Ed Logan, Jack Hale, James Mitchell, Wayne Jackson - horns
Sugar Sweets - backing vocals

References

External links

1973 albums
Jerry Lee Lewis albums
Mercury Records albums